Oldham is a town in Greater Manchester, in northern England.

Oldham may also refer to:

Places 
 In Canada
 Oldham, Nova Scotia, a community in Halifax
 In England
 Administrative entities
Metropolitan Borough of Oldham, a current local government district of Greater Manchester, England
County Borough of Oldham, a former local government district of Lancashire, England, including some of Greater Manchester
OL postcode area or Oldham postcode area in England, including some of Greater Manchester
Prestwich-cum-Oldham, a former ecclesiastic parish of the hundred of Salford, Lancashire, England, in Greater Manchester
 Constituencies
Oldham (UK Parliament constituency), a former parliamentary borough abolished 1950
Oldham East (UK Parliament constituency), a constituency abolished 1983
Oldham West (UK Parliament constituency), a constituency abolished 1997
Oldham East and Saddleworth (UK Parliament constituency), a current constituency of Greater Manchester
Oldham West and Royton (UK Parliament constituency), a current constituency of Greater Manchester
 In the United States
 Oldham, Mississippi, an unincorporated community
 Oldham, Missouri, an unincorporated community
 Oldham, South Dakota, a small city
 Oldham County, Kentucky
 Oldham County, Texas

Publications 
Oldham Advertiser, a weekly local newspaper in Oldham, England
Oldham Evening Chronicle, a daily local newspaper in Oldham, England

Sports 
Oldham Athletic A.F.C., an association football team based in Oldham, England

Surname 
 Oldham (surname)

Transport 
Oldham Mumps railway station, a railway station in central Oldham
Oldham Werneth railway station, a railway station in southern Oldham
Oldham Loop Line, a heavy rail line in Greater Manchester
Oldham Street, in the Northern Quarter of the City of Manchester, England

Engineering 
Oldham Coupling, a type of shaft coupling used to accommodate large radial displacement between two shafts.

See also 
 Newham (disambiguation), a name formed by contrast with Oldham